The 2007 ARCA Re/Max Series was the 55th season of the ARCA Racing Series. The season began on February 10, 2007 at Daytona International Speedway with the Daytona ARCA 200 and ended on October 14, 2007 at Toledo Speedway with the Hantz Group 200. Frank Kimmel, driving for Clement Racing, won the season championship, his eighth title in a row and ninth overall.

Results and standings

Races

Drivers' championship
(key) Bold – Pole position awarded by time. Italics – Pole position set by final practice results or rainout. * – Most laps led.
{|
| valign="top" |

ARCA Menards Series seasons
Arca remax Series